John David Waldorf (July 29, 1909 – August 12, 1982) was an American football player and coach and, later, a long-time college football and college basketball official. He played college football at the University of Missouri, where he was a two-time All-Big Six selection. Waldorf served as the head football coach at Nebraska Wesleyan University in Lincoln, Nebraska from 1930 to 1932. After retiring from coaching, he became an official in the Big Eight Conference.

Waldorf was the brother of college football coaches Pappy Waldorf, Paul D. Waldorf, and Bob Waldorf, as well as the son of Methodist Episcopal Church bishop Ernest Lynn Waldorf. He died on August 12, 1982, at Fitzgibbon Memorial Hospital in Marshall, Missouri.

Head coaching record

Football

References

1909 births
1982 deaths
American football fullbacks
American football quarterbacks
College football officials
College men's basketball referees in the United States
Mid-America Intercollegiate Athletics Association commissioners
Missouri Tigers football players
Missouri Tigers  men's basketball players
Nebraska Wesleyan Prairie Wolves athletic directors
Nebraska Wesleyan Prairie Wolves football coaches
Nebraska Wesleyan Prairie Wolves men's basketball coaches
Players of American football from Syracuse, New York
Basketball players from Syracuse, New York